The 2006–07 season in Danish 2nd Division was divided into two groups. The two winners, Lolland-Falster Alliancen and Skive IK, were promoted to the 2007–08 Danish 1st Division, together with the winner of a promotion game, Hvidovre IF, between the two runners-up.

Second squad teams were not eligible for promotion or allowed to play in the promotion game.

East group

West group

Promotion game
The two runners-up played a promotion game on a home and away basis.

First leg

Second leg

Danish 2nd Division seasons
3
Danish